Olympiades or Les Olympiades may refer to:
 Les Olympiades, a district in Paris's 13th arrondissement
 Olympiades (Paris Métro), a station on Line 14 of the Paris Métro in the area
 Paris, 13th District (known in French as Les Olympiades), a 2021 film

See also 
 Olympiad